Courtial is a French surname. Notable people with the surname include:

Édouard Courtial (born 1973), French politician
Jean Courtial (1903–1966), French physician and polytechnician
, French sociologist

French-language surnames